The 2018 UEC European Track Championships was the ninth edition of the elite UEC European Track Championships in track cycling and took place at the Sir Chris Hoy Velodrome in Glasgow, Scotland, between 2 and 7 August 2018. The event was organised by the European Cycling Union. All European champions were awarded the UEC European Champion jersey which may be worn by the champion throughout the year when competing in the same event at other competitions.

The Championships formed part of both the inaugural European Cycling Championships bringing together track, road, mountain bike and BMX events, and the inaugural multi-sport 2018 European Championships bringing together seven different sports.

The 12 Olympic events (sprint, team sprint, team pursuit, keirin, madison and omnium for men and women), as well as 10 other events are on the program for these European Championships.

The Netherlands led the medal table with five golds, while Germany won the most medals with 11. Hosts Great Britain came second in both golds and medals. Russian sprinter Daria Shmeleva was the most successful individual athlete with three gold medals, while Great Britain's Laura Kenny set a new record for career European Championship titles with her eleventh and twelfth gold medals.

Schedule

Events

Notes 
 Competitors named in italics only participated in rounds prior to the final.
 These events are not contested in the Olympics.
 In the Olympics, these events are contested within the omnium only.

Medal table

See also
 2018 UEC European Track Championships (under-23 & junior)

References

External links 
 European Championships
 2018 UEC Track Elite European Championships
Results book

 
UEC European Track Championships
European Track Championships
2018 UEC
International cycle races hosted by Scotland
International sports competitions in Glasgow
UEC European Track Championships
Cycling in Scotland
track